Jinwan Media Group is a Chinese media company based in Tianjin, China. It owns five newspapers, three journals, and one website. Its subsidiary Jinwanbao (or Tianjin Today Evening News), established in 1984, is a major newspaper published in China, with daily circulation exceeding 700,000 as of 2006. Bohai Morning News (渤海早报) and Zhonglaonian Times (中老年时报) were awarded Top Ten Chinese Media Brands in 2013.

References

External links

Jinwanbao

Newspaper companies of China
Mass media in Tianjin